Solomon Juryevich (correct: Uravich) Adlivankin was a Soviet linguist, the Dean of philological faculty at Perm State University (1967–1971), the author of handbooks on Old Slavonic Phonetics, unique in the 1970s; he was one of the Perm derivatology school founders, also he took part in compiling Akchim dialect dictionary.

Sources
 Solomon Adlivankin at Russian Wikipedia: Адливанкин, Соломон Юрьевич // Википедия, свободная энциклопедия.
 The Memoirs of Solomon Adlivankin: А жизнь — одна и неразъятна. Воспоминания о Соломоне Юрьевиче Адливанкине. Пермь: Издательский центр «Титул», 2011. – 352 с., илл.

References

1922 births
Saratov
1985 deaths
Linguists from Russia
Academic staff of Perm State University
20th-century linguists